Bucculatrix salutatoria is a species of moth in the family Bucculatricidae. It is found in North America, where it has been recorded from Utah, Colorado, Wyoming and British Columbia. Thehe species was first described by Annette Frances Braun in 1925.

The wingspan is 8-9.5 mm.

The larvae feed on Artemisia tridentata. They mine the leaves of their host plant.

References

Natural History Museum Lepidoptera generic names catalog

Bucculatricidae
Moths described in 1925
Moths of North America
Taxa named by Annette Frances Braun